Sinezona garciai is a species of minute sea snail, a marine gastropod mollusk or micromollusk in the family Scissurellidae, the little slit shells.

Description

Distribution
This species occurs in the Caribbean Sea.

References

  Geiger D.L. (2012) Monograph of the little slit shells. Volume 1. Introduction, Scissurellidae. pp. 1–728. Volume 2. Anatomidae, Larocheidae, Depressizonidae, Sutilizonidae, Temnocinclidae. pp. 729–1291. Santa Barbara Museum of Natural History Monographs Number 7

Scissurellidae
Gastropods described in 2006